The Gabba Ward is a Brisbane City Council ward covering Woolloongabba, Dutton Park, East Brisbane, Highgate Hill, Kangaroo Point, South Brisbane and West End. Greens candidate Jonathan Sriranganathan (then known as Sri) won the ward in 2016, with a 14% gain in primary votes. The ward was retained by the Greens at the 2020 election, with a swing towards incumbent Greens councillor Jonathan Sriranganathan of 12.4% in first preference votes, achieving a total of 62.3% of two-party preferred votes.

Councillors for The Gabba Ward

Results

References

City of Brisbane wards